Frederick Augustus Ford Smith (16 May 1887 – 23 December 1957) was an English footballer who played as a full back in the period prior to World War I.

Football career
He was born in Buxton and started his career playing in the Manchester League before signing for a fledgling Wigan Town in December 1905. His professional career began in 1906 during which he played League football for Stockport County and Derby County before giving up playing full-time to concentrate on his job as a motor mechanic in Macclesfield.

In May 1913, he was recruited by Southern Football League Southampton, by when he was at the "veteran" stage of his career. He initially played for the reserve team, where he was appointed captain. His "clean cut, up-standing image" had a beneficial effect on the youngsters. Following three successive defeats in October 1913, he made his first-team debut in a 2–0 defeat at Reading on 1 November, replacing Bert Lee at right-back. His "determination and speed" enabled him to retain his place for the next ten games, before giving way to Richard Brooks in January. Smith made a further five appearances in the latter part of the season.

At the end of the season, he was struggling to retain full fitness and decided to retire to concentrate on his motor career and returned to Macclesfield.

Family
Fred was a brother to William "Buxton" Smith who played for Buxton, Manchester City, and to Lancelot who also played for Wigan Town.

References

1887 births
1957 deaths
People from Buxton
Footballers from Derbyshire
English footballers
Association football defenders
Wigan Town A.F.C. players
Stockport County F.C. players
Derby County F.C. players
Macclesfield Town F.C. players
Southampton F.C. players
Southern Football League players
English Football League players